The Fowl Twins Get What They Deserve is the third and final book of The Fowl Twins series written by Eoin Colfer. It was released on October 19, 2021, and is preceded by The Fowl Twins Deny All Charges.

Plot
Myles and Beckett are at CORPSE so that Myles could give a lecture but then Lord Teddy Bleedham-Drye appears and, in his unending quest to kill the twins, attacks Myles with his weaponized jet. After he fails Teddy is assumed to be dead by all, though Myles has his suspicions. Myles, Beckett & Lazuli then visit a mortuary, meet ghosts and encounter clones. It all ends in an epic showdown on Scilly Island between the Regrettables (Myles, Beckett, Whistle Blower & Lazuli) and Teddy.

Main Characters
Myles Fowl An intelligent boy who has almost no physical ability but is good at coming up with plans. He finds out that he has the ability to turn into a dwarf as effect of when he was possessed in Artemis Fowl the Last Guardian. Twin to Beckett Fowl.

Beckett Fowl An energetic, transpecies polyglot and one of the few people in the world to have mastered the cluster punch. Myles’ twin.

Lapis Lazuli A pixie-elf-hybrid (also known as a pixel) that grew up in an orphanage and wants to know who her mother is. Serves as Fowl Ambassador and usually breaks many fairy rules while on Fowl adventures.

Lord Teddy Bleedham-Drye The Duke of Scilly. Commonly referred to as just “Teddy”, before he meets the Fowl Twins he is obsessed with two things; becoming immortal or living as long as possible and finding the Lionheart ring so that he could become king. When he meets the twins he finds another obsession, killing them.

Reception 
Kirkus Reviews wrote, "Like its bestselling progenitors, a nonstop spinoff afroth with high-tech, spectacular magic, and silly business." 

The Children's Book Review wrote,Bursting with fascinatingly imaginative Bond-style technology, fairy magic, mythical creatures, espionage, crime, and Colfer’s characteristically witty use of language, The Fowl Twins Get What They Deserve is funny, exciting, and original. It is the blending of genres—spy thriller meets fantasy novel and science fiction, all rolled into one—that makes these books so enticing, inviting readers to think outside the box about narrative and fiction.

References 

Artemis Fowl books
2021 fantasy novels
2021 children's books
Science fantasy novels
2019 Irish novels